Lurpak is a Danish brand of butter owned by Arla Foods. It is sold in over 75 countries worldwide, and is known for its distinctive silver packaging. Lurpak came into existence in October 1901 after a combination of several Danish dairy farmers decided to create and register a common brand and mark for butter to increase sales. Its logo is based on the lur, an ancient instrument once used in Scandinavia.

Lurpak's principal market is the United Kingdom.

Lurpak butter is made from milk, but their spreadable range contains rapeseed oil.

Product range

Lurpak Slightly Salted Butter
Lurpak Cheese Spread
Lurpak Lighter Spreadable
Lurpak Lightest Spreadable
Lurpak Organic Spreadable
Lurpak Unsalted
Lurpak Spreadable Slightly Salted Butter
Lurpak Spreadable Margarine Butter
Lurpak With Crushed Garlic
Lurpak Olive Oil Spread
Lurpak Softest Slightly Salted (launched Spring 2018)

Advertising campaigns
In 1985, Lurpak launched a television campaign for the United Kingdom featuring Douglas, a trombonist made from butter, trying to play the famous classical composition Flight of the Bumblebee by Rimsky-Korsakov at the end of each advert spot (usually being stopped by the voiceover "Not now, Douglas!"), in tribute to Arthur Tolcher's appearances on the television show Morecambe and Wise. This was created by Aardman Animations, and featured the voice of Penelope Keith, with the intro to the Agnus Dei from Faure's Requiem as background music. This ran for almost twenty years, until Lurpak repositioned with the "Good Food Deserves Lurpak" campaign, created by Wieden+Kennedy, and featuring the voice of Rutger Hauer.

Similar brands 
In the United Kingdom, discount retailer Aldi has introduced its own brand lookalike "butter blended with rapeseed oil", named Norpak, which is manufactured in Ireland. Lidl and Tesco also have their own brand lookalikes, named Danpak and Butterpak, respectively.

References

External links

 
 Lurpak UK site
 

Products introduced in 1901
Food brands of Denmark
Arla Foods
Brand name dairy products
Butter
Multinational companies headquartered in Denmark